The 6th World Science Fiction Convention (Worldcon), also known as Torcon, was held on 3–5 July 1948 at RAI Purdy Studios in Toronto, Ontario, Canada. This was the first Worldcon held outside the United States.

The chairman was Ned McKeown.

Participants 

Attendance was approximately 200.

Guests of Honour 

 Robert Bloch (pro)
 Bob Tucker (fan)

See also 

 Hugo Award
 Science fiction
 Speculative fiction
 World Science Fiction Society
 Worldcon

References

See also 

 World Science Fiction Society

1948 conferences
1948 in Canada
Science fiction conventions in Canada
Worldcon